Reindeer Lake may refer to:

Reindeer Lake, on the border between Saskatchewan and Manitoba, Canada
Reindeer Lake/Lindbergh Lodge Aerodrome, an airport on an island in Reindeer Lake, Saskatchewan, Canada
Reinsvatnet (Reindeer Lake), large mountainous lake west of Mellsjøen lake, northeast of Lillehammer, Oppland county, Norway
Reinsvatnet (Reindeer Lake) (Reinsvatnet R1), paleo-postglacial lake of the Younger Dryas with human and reindeer archaeological evidence, Sunndal Mountains, Møre og Romsdal county, Norway
Reinevatn (Reindeer Lake), small lake in Bykle, Aust-Agder county, Norway
Reingardslivatnet (Reindeer Lake; Reindeer Farm Lake), small lake in Rana, Nordland county, Norway
Reinoksvatnet (Reindeer Lake), small lake in Hamarøy, Nordland county, Norway
Reindeer Lake, small lake near Fairbanks, North Star Borough, Alaska, U.S.A.; see List of lakes in Alaska
Stor-Rensjön (Great Reindeer Lake), 5th deepest lake in Sweden; see List of lakes in Sweden

See also
Reindeer (disambiguation)